Gach Darvazeh (also Romanized as Gach Darvāzeh; also known as Būnbāyūmī) is a village in Jowzar Rural District, in the Central District of Mamasani County, Fars Province, Iran. At the 2006 census, its population was 121, in 34 families.

References 

Populated places in Mamasani County